Southern Wells Jr./Sr. High School is a public high school located approximately 4.5 miles southwest of Poneto, Indiana in greater Wells County. Southern Wells serves the entire elementary, junior high and high school for the area. The school was opened after a consolidation between Jackson, Chester, Nottingham, and Liberty Schools.  Southern Wells Schools are located in the southern part of the county on county road 300 West.

Athletics
Southern Wells High School football team was the 2001 state championship for division 1A.

See also
 List of high schools in Indiana

References

External links
Southern Wells Schools web page

Education in Wells County, Indiana
Educational institutions in the United States with year of establishment missing
Public high schools in Indiana
Public middle schools in Indiana